The Welcome Islands are a small rocky archipelago to the north of the main island of South Georgia. They are to the east of Bird Island.

These islands were discovered by Captain James Cook in 1775. The name dates back to at least 1912 and is now well established.

The highest point in the islands is

See also 
 Composite Antarctic Gazetteer
 List of antarctic and sub-antarctic islands
 List of Antarctic islands north of 60° S
Whalers Passage

References

Islands of South Georgia
Uninhabited islands of South Georgia and the South Sandwich Islands